The Evangelical Lutheran Church of Canada (ELCC) was a Lutheran Christian denomination active in Canada from 1967 to 1985. Prior to gaining autonomy, its congregations comprised the Canada District of the American Lutheran Church. The first presiding officer of the ELCC was Karl Holfeld.

On January 1, 1986, the ELCC merged with the Lutheran Church in America - Canada Section, to form the Evangelical Lutheran Church in Canada.

References

Lutheranism in Canada
Canada
Christian organizations established in 1967
Christian organizations disestablished in the 1980s
1967 establishments in Canada
1986 disestablishments in Canada